Dykema is a surname. Notable people with the surname include:

Carolyn Dykema (born 1967), American politician
Craig Dykema (born 1959), American basketball player
Peter W. Dykema (1873–1951), American music educator

Surnames of Frisian origin